Amanita carneiphylla is a species of Amanita found in Western Australia growing among Eucalyptus, Banksia, and Allocasuarina

References

External links

carneiphylla
Fungi of Australia